Torture Tech Overdrive is a various artists compilation album released in 1991 by If It Moves.... In October 1994 the album was reissued for a limited run of 1000 pressings by Cleopatra Records with an extended track listing additional versions of tracks. The uncredited song is "Back in Black", an cover of the hard rock band AC/DC by Chase's musical outlet Rendering Service. The song "Lupe Velez" by Jimmy Jazz is about the illogicality of attempting to create a "beautiful suicide."

Reception
Sonic Boom gave Torture Tech Overdrive a positive review and said "definitely a compilation to try and find regardless of its limited edition status."

Track listing

Personnel
Adapted from the Torture Tech Overdrive liner notes.

 Carol – compiling, design
 Chase – compiling
 Billy Peculiar – cover art

Release history

References

External links 
 

1991 compilation albums
Electro-industrial compilation albums
Cleopatra Records compilation albums
Re-Constriction Records compilation albums